Alexander Maxovich Shilov (born 6 October 1943) is a prominent Soviet and Russian portrait painter.

Biography
Shilov was born in Moscow, and between 1968 and 1973 studied at the Surikov Moscow Art Institute. In 1976 he became a member of the Union of Artists of the USSR. In 1985 he became People's Artist of the USSR. In 1992 one of the asteroids (4164 Shilov discovered by Lyudmila Ivanovna Chernykh) was named after him. In 1996 he donated to the Russian Government 365 portraits painted by him. Since 2001 he is a full member of Russian Academy of Arts

In March 2014 he signed a letter in support of the position of the President of Russia Vladimir Putin on Russia's military intervention in Ukraine.

Works
The speciality of Alexander Shilov are ceremonial portraits, often painted from photographs without even seeing his subjects. He painted more than 600 of them. Hailed in his youth as the great champion of Socialist Realism and patronized by Kremlin rulers, he painted portraits of all the leaders of the Soviet Union and Russia including Leonid Brezhnev, Yuri Andropov, Konstantin Chernenko, Mikhail Gorbachev, Boris Yeltsin, Vladimir Putin, most of Cosmonauts, etc. He also produced portraits of his daughter Mashenka, his mother and grandmother.

Shilov's opponents insisted that his portraits are little more than the flattering photographs transferred onto canvas, but his proponents claim a unique realistic style directly inherited from Dmitry Levitzky and Orest Kiprensky. In 1997 one of the leading proponents, the Moscow mayor Yuriy Luzhkov, opened the Moscow State Art Gallery of People's Artist of the USSR Alexander Shilov, just several steps away from the Moscow Kremlin. The gallery is devoted solely to exhibitions of Shilov's work.

References

External links

Website of the Shillov Gallery
Biography in Russian

People's Artists of the USSR (visual arts)
Full Members of the Russian Academy of Arts
20th-century Russian painters
Russian male painters
21st-century Russian painters
Soviet painters
1943 births
Living people
Artists from Moscow
Russian portrait painters
20th-century Russian male artists
21st-century Russian male artists